Kazimieras is a Lithuanian form of the masculine name Casimir. Its female form is Kazimiera. Its  diminutive forms are Kazys and Kaziukas.

Notable people with this name include:

Eugenijus Kazimieras Jovaiša (born 1940), Lithuanian painter
Kazimieras Būga (1879–1924), Lithuanian linguist and philologist
Kazimieras G. Prapuolenis, or Kaz, (born 1959), American cartoonist and illustrator
Kazimieras Garšva (born 1950), Lithuanian linguist, and the leader of the controversial "Vilnija" organisation
Kazimieras Jaunius (1848–1908), Lithuanian priest and linguist
Kazimieras Naruševičius (1920–2004), Lithuanian painter
Kazimieras Steponas Šaulys (1872–1964), Lithuanian Roman Catholic priest, theologian, and signatory to the Act of Independence of Lithuania
Kazimieras Uoka (born 1951), politician and signatory of the 1990 Act of the Re-Establishment of the State of Lithuania
Kazimieras Vasiliauskas (born 1990), Lithuanian racing driver
Kazimieras Venclauskis (1880–1940), Lithuanian attorney, politician, and philanthropist
Vytautas Kazimieras Jonynas (1907–1997), one of the most renowned 20th century Lithuanian artists

Lithuanian masculine given names